Nicholas Thorburn (born 27 November 1981), also known by his stage name Nick Diamonds, is a Canadian musician originally from Campbell River. He has fronted numerous bands such as The Unicorns, Th' Corn Gangg, Islands, Reefer, and Human Highway.

History
Thorburn was born in 1981 in Campbell River, British Columbia, Canada, which he says has influenced his songwriting. Nature, in particular whales, are a subject of interest; his lyrics include references to rivers, swans and frogs. He also had a formative experience in a visit, along with his father, to see the killer whale Luna; his memories of the visit became an influential part of Islands' debut album Return to the Sea.

Thorburn has fronted The Unicorns, Th' Corn Gangg, Islands, Reefer, and Human Highway. Thorburn has gone by the stage name "Nick Diamonds."

His vocals have been noted as a distinguishing feature of The Unicorns and Islands. His production technique involves dark personification over enjoyable music, though he is "usually wary of composing dance tracks." This contrast is observed in his live performance as well.

In 2005, he co-wrote with Adam Gollner the satirical charity song "Do They Know It's Hallowe'en?" organizing the collaboration of many artists. He guest performed on Les Savy Fav's 2007 album Let's Stay Friends. Reefer, his collaborative album with producer Daddy Kev as Reefer, was released on Alpha Pup Records in 2008.

Thorburn has made an album with Honus Honus (also known as Ryan Kattner) of the band Man Man: "One thing that has been floated around is Honus Honus from Man Man and I making a record in a new (sub)genre we are developing, called Doom Wop, which is essentially low frequency, and extremely slowed down music atop traditional doo wop harmonies. Or something." The project, called Mister Heavenly, also involves drummer Joe Plummer of Modest Mouse and The Black Heart Procession and has had actor Michael Cera playing bass on the tour.

He released the solo album, I Am an Attic, on his Bandcamp page in 2011. Thorburn was featured on the 2012 El-P album Cancer 4 Cure, singing the chorus of the track "Stay Down". In 2014, Thorburn composed the theme music and score for the critically acclaimed podcast Serial. In 2015, he released a second solo album titled City of Quartz.

Discography

Albums
 Unicorns Are People Too as The Unicorns (2003)
 Who Will Cut Our Hair When We're Gone? as The Unicorns (2003)
 Return to the Sea as Islands (2006)
 Arm's Way  as Islands (2008)
 Reefer  as Reefer (2008)
 Moody Motorcycle as Human Highway (2008)
 Vapours as Islands (2009)
 Out of Love as Mister Heavenly (2011)
 I Am an Attic solo album as Nick Diamonds (2011)
 A Sleep & a Forgetting as Islands (2012)
 Ski Mask as Islands (2013)
 Music from SERIAL (2014)
 City of Quartz as Nick Diamonds (2015)
 Should I Remain Here, At Sea? as Islands (2016)
 Taste as Islands (2016)
 Boxing the Moonlight as Mister Heavenly (2017)
 Islomania as Islands (2021)

Guest appearances
 Busdriver – "Happy Insider" from Jhelli Beam (2009)
 Nocando – "You Got Some Nerve" from Jimmy the Lock (2010)
 Buck 65 – "Gee Whiz" from 20 Odd Years (2011)
 Fat Tony and Tom Cruz – "Bad Habits" from Double Dragon (2012)
 El-P – "Stay Down" from Cancer 4 Cure (2012)

Filmography

See also

Music of Canada
Canadian rock
List of Canadian musicians

References

External links
 
 Human Highway at CBC Radio 3

1981 births
Canadian indie rock musicians
Canadian rock singers
Canadian songwriters
Concordia University alumni
Living people
People from Campbell River, British Columbia
21st-century Canadian male singers
Islands (band) members
The Unicorns members
Human Highway (band) members
Mister Heavenly members